The Rice Solar Energy Project was a 150 MW concentrating solar power facility project proposed for Rice Valley in the southern Mojave Desert, within Riverside County in southern California. It was put on indefinite hold in 2014.

Description

The project's innovative molten salt storage system was to capture solar energy and deliver power to the grid even after the sun goes down. The facility was "expected to power 68,000 homes, create up to 450 construction jobs, and generate more than $48 million in state and local tax revenue over the first 10 years of operation."

Details
The project was developed by Rice Solar Energy, LLC, a subsidiary of SolarReserve, LLC.

The project had undergone extensive environmental review and had proposed mitigations for environmental impacts from its construction and operation.

In December 2011, Secretary of the Interior Ken Salazar approved a transmission line, access road and substation on public lands that will connect the Rice project to the power grid in California.

In January 2013, the California Public Utilities Commission (CPUC) approved SolarReserve's amended 25-year power purchase agreement (PPA) with Pacific Gas and Electric (PG&E).

Indefinite hold
As of October 2014, SolarReserve put the Rice Solar Project on "indefinite hold". The reason was the investment tax credit for renewable energy slated to drop from 30 percent to 10 percent at the end of 2016, and only available for projects that are fully online by then."

See also

References

External links 

Solar power stations in California
Solar power in the Mojave Desert
Energy in Riverside County, California
Proposed buildings and structures in California
Proposed solar power stations in the United States
Buildings and structures in Riverside County, California